In United States federal agriculture legislation, the Agricultural Adjustment Act Amendment of 1935 (P.L. 74-320) made several important and lasting changes to the Agricultural Adjustment Act of 1933 (P.L. 73-10). Franklin D. Roosevelt signed the Act into law on August 24, 1935.

Section 22 of the law gave the President authority to impose quotas when imports interfered with commodity programs designed to raise prices and farm income. Section 32 was designed to widen market outlets for surplus agricultural commodities by permanently appropriating funds (30% of annual gross customs receipts) to promote food consumption, reduce agricultural surpluses, and provide for the food needs of low income populations. Section 32 funds are used by the Secretary to purchase surplus commodities for donation outside normal channels of trade (e.g., to school lunch programs), and to support the costs of child nutrition programs. Section 22 has been superseded, but Section 32 continues to operate and is used primarily for child nutrition programs. In 1936, this act was declared unconstitutional and was therefore only a short-term benefit to farmers.

See also
Potato Control Law
Resettlement Administration

References

External links
 
 

 

United States federal agriculture legislation
1935 in the United States
1935 in law
Acts of the 74th United States Congress